Ted Sioeng (pronounced 'shyong'), also known as Xiong Delong and Sioeng San Wong, is an Indonesian businessman with interests in the United States, China, Vietnam and other parts of Asia, worth around US$500 million.

Background
Sioeng grew up in Indonesia. Raised in an ethnically Chinese family, he has a strong affinity for China, which is now the focus of his business interests, while he also admires the United States - he and his family have been based in Los Angeles since 1987.

Business interests
While in his 20s, Sioeng became successful selling foam rubber padding. In the 1970s, he was quick to recognize that money could be made in emerging China and he built a multimillion-dollar fortune selling the Chinese used factory equipment – such as for cigarette- and toy-manufacturing and in the medical field – and exporting Chinese cigarettes to the West. In China, he goes by the name Xiong Delong.

He quickly saw that by donating money to good causes, such as to build schools, hospitals, and roads, he could gain favour with local governments. In Yunnan, this approach gained him a license to sell the popular Hongtashan brand of cigarettes – called 'Red Pagoda Mountain' in the U.S. – outside of China. He now runs the business as a (dollar-based) joint venture.

He is owner of the Chinese-language International Daily News, published in the United States and Indonesia.

U.S. campaign finance controversy
Sioeng was a major figure in the 1996 United States campaign finance controversy, notably sitting next to Bill Clinton and Al Gore at fundraising events after having donated to the Democratic Party funds allegedly linked to China. In 1997 the U.S. Congress was informed by the U.S. attorney general, and the directors of the CIA, FBI, and NSA that they had credible intelligence information indicating Sioeng was an agent of China.

According to an unclassified final draft of a report by the US Senate committee then investigating campaign finance abuses, half of the $400,000 given to the Democrats by Sioeng and his family was "funded by transfer from overseas accounts," suggesting that the money came from the Chinese government.

Family and personal life
Sioeng, who is ethnically an Dutch-Indo descent, began his life in an orphanage. He was then brought up (in Indonesia) by an Indonesian Chinese couple, which led to his  interests in China.

He is married with five children, including his eldest, daughter Jessica Elnitiarta, who heads the family interests in California and was also involved in the Clinton controversy, having donated $300,000, some of which was alleged to have been Chinese government money.

Mr. Ted Sioeng holds a Singapore passport but his wife and children are permanent U.S. residents. He is able to speak good English.

References 

Year of birth missing (living people)
Indonesian people of Chinese descent
Living people
People from Jakarta
Indonesian businesspeople
Place of birth missing (living people)